The February 13, 1979, windstorm was a natural phenomenon that took place in Pacific Canada and the United States. During the early morning, an intense wave cyclone moved across southern Vancouver Island, British Columbia. South of the low center, a strong atmospheric pressure gradient was carried across Washington, with associated high winds. With a cold airflow moving toward the northeast interacting with the high terrain of the Olympic Mountains, a lee low developed east of the Olympics. The mesoscale low caused a particularly intense pressure gradient across the Kitsap Peninsula region.

Wind velocity
At 6 mbar over 8 miles, the geostrophic wind potential easily exceeded 200 knots (which roughly translates to about 100 knots in ageostrophic flow over the Earth's rough surface, or 115 mph). As reported by the crew of the Hood Canal Bridge, average winds reached at least 80 mph out of the south, with gusts into the triple digits. These wind velocities were cross-checked on two different anemometers at the bridge control tower.

Damage
Extensive damage to trees on surrounding private timberland also corroborate the extreme intensity of this tempest. The pressure of wind and wave on the Hood Canal Bridge stressed the structure enough to cause catastrophic failure. It is suspected that a severe list in the bridge exposed pontoon access hatches to the waves, which subsequently tore the covers loose and allowed water to enter the flotation devices, causing sections to sink. It took nearly three years and over $140 million U.S. to rebuild the lost bridge.

See also 
 Storm

Further reading 
 
 

1979 disasters in Canada
1979 in Oregon
1979 in Washington (state)
1979 meteorology
Pacific Northwest storms